Fred R. Sloan is a retired major general in the United States Air National Guard and former Director of Air National Guard Forces and Air National Guard Assistant to the Commander of Air Combat Command, as well as Assistant Adjutant General of Wisconsin for the Air.

Biography
Sloan was born in Milwaukee, Wisconsin and graduated from Marquette University High School in 1966. He would graduate from the University of Wisconsin-Madison in 1970 with a B.A. in Psychology.

Career
Sloan joined the Wisconsin Air National Guard in 1971 and entered pilot training at Laughlin Air Force Base. He would acquire more than 6,000 hours flying in a Convair C-131 Samaritan, Lockheed T-33 Shooting Star, Cessna T-37 Tweet, Northrop T-38 Talon, Convair F-102 Delta Dagger, Cessna O-2 Skymaster, Cessna A-37 Dragonfly, Fairchild Republic A-10 Thunderbolt II, and General Dynamics F-16 Fighting Falcon.

Awards he has received include the Legion of Merit, the Meritorious Service Medal, the Air Force Commendation Medal, the Air Force Achievement Medal, the Air Force Outstanding Unit Award with three oak leaf clusters, the Armed Forces Reserve Medal with hourglass device, the National Defense Service Medal, the Small Arms Marksmanship Ribbon with service star, and the Air Force Training Ribbon.

References

Military personnel from Milwaukee
United States Air Force generals
Recipients of the Legion of Merit
University of Wisconsin–Madison College of Letters and Science alumni
Living people
Year of birth missing (living people)
Marquette University High School alumni